The Ohio River and Charleston Railway was a Southeastern railroad that operated in the late 19th century.

Creation

Tennessee
On July 17, 1893, Charles E. Hellier bought a section of railroad known as the "Clinchfield route" from Baring Brothers, an English banking company that had recently gone bankrupt due to the Panic of 1893, for $550,000. He then organized the Ohio River and Charleston Railway Company (of Tennessee). Two months later, in September 1893, he extended the railroad to go from Chestoa, Tennessee, to a station five miles south of Huntdale, North Carolina.

South Carolina
The Ohio River and Charleston Railway Company (of South Carolina) was organized in 1894 to take over the Charleston, Cincinnati and Chicago Railroad.

Consolidation of the Four Companies
In November 1894, the Ohio River and Charleston Railway Company (of North Carolina), the Ohio River and Charleston Railway Company (of Virginia), and the Ohio River and Charleston Railway Company (of Tennessee) were consolidated to form the Ohio River and Charleston Railway Company.

Fate
The line went into foreclosure in June 1898, with South Carolina property being sold under foreclosure on August 1, 1898, to organizers of the South Carolina and Georgia Extension Railroad Company (of South Carolina).

In February 1899, the South Carolina and Georgia Extension Railroad Company of South Carolina was consolidated with the South Carolina and Georgia Extension Railroad Company of North Carolina, to form the South Carolina and Georgia Extension Railroad Company.

In 1902, the South Carolina and Georgia Extension Railroad became part of the Southern Railway – Carolina Division. Meanwhile that same year, The Tennessee portion became part of the South and Western Railway.

See also
Charleston, Cincinnati and Chicago Railroad

References

Note: Reference 1 contains some incorrect information

External links
www.AbandonedRails.com
Thermal Belt Rail Trail
johnsonsdepot.com
PWRR Railroad Reporting Marks

Defunct South Carolina railroads
Railway companies established in 1894
Railway companies disestablished in 1898